Michael John Bettaney (13 February 1950 – 16 August 2018), also known as Michael Malkin, was a British intelligence officer who worked in the counter-espionage branch of the Security Service often known as MI5. He was convicted at the Old Bailey in 1984 of offences under section 1 of the Official Secrets Act 1911 after passing sensitive documents to the Soviet Embassy in London and attempting to act as an agent-in-place for the Soviet Union. His trial was conducted 'in camera' and some of the press reporting is available.

Early life

Born into modest circumstances in Fenton, Stoke on Trent, Bettaney later attended Pembroke College, Oxford, and graduated from the university, where he was allegedly known for his admiration for Adolf Hitler and for singing the "Horst-Wessel-Lied" in local public houses. Bettaney joined the Security Service in 1975, soon after his graduation from Oxford.

Career 

Bettaney was posted to Belfast in June 1976 and was injured in a car bomb attack. Dr Aaron Edwards, a writer on 'The Troubles' and intelligence states that during his posting he served in Londonderry (Derry) as a source handler, one person he dealt with was Willie Carlin (died 6/2/2023) a well-placed agent within the Provisional IRA. Bettaney after his conviction in 1983, shared his knowledge with an IRA prisoner whilst in Brixton Prison and Carlin had to be withdrawn. 

Two years later he returned to London and participated in the newly created anti-terrorist branch.  In December 1982 he was transferred to the Soviet counterespionage section.  Working here, an outstation based in Gower Street, London (and not at MI5's then main building in Curzon Street off Berkeley Square), he took a large number of secret documents home with him from the office, before trying to turn over some selected highlights to the KGB's London rezident (Head of KGB Station or rezidentura), General Arkady V. Guk, by dropping the documentation through the letterbox of Guk's house, Bettaney knowing the address via his work. Bettaney did not know that another member of the Station, KGB [Acting] Colonel Oleg Gordievsky, was an MI6 agent. Gordievsky informed MI6 and the British authorities managed to identify and arrest Bettaney. When Bettaney was arrested at his home in September 1983 he had been preparing to fly to Vienna and hand over more secrets to the Soviets.

There has been put forward an alternative view of the above, to wit that, far from incompetently pushing secret materials through Guk's letterbox,  "[Bettaney] delivered a suitably cryptic message for the Soviet embassy’s KGB staff. It required them to make contact with him using standard spycraft techniques: pins on escalators, numbered steps, etc."

Although Bettaney subsequently claimed to have been inspired by political motives, an alternative theory of his motivation is alleged to arise from the following: he had received a final warning following  a  criminal  conviction  for  fare-dodging  and  an  arrest  for being drunk in the street.  A further offence of using an out-of-date railway season ticket followed, and although Bettaney had failed to declare it, as he was required to do, he knew it would be disclosed during  his  next  routine  security  screening,  which  would  inevitably lead to his dismissal.

The management of Bettaney while working for MI5 was examined by the Security Commission, who concluded that "[t]he Commission make a number of serious criticisms of the errors by the Security Service in relation to the management of Bettaney's career..."

Aftermath 

Bettaney was sentenced to 23 years in prison, and was released on licence in 1998. While in prison he had learned the Russian language via broadcasts from Radio Moscow.

Bettaney set up home with a pro-socialist woman who had written to him and visited him while in prison. His never-extinct Roman Catholic faith (which he retained, alongside a Marxist tendency) apparently strengthened in later years.

He died on 16 August 2018.

References

Alumni of Pembroke College, Oxford
British people convicted of spying for the Soviet Union
British spies for the Soviet Union
Double agents
MI5 personnel
1950 births
2018 deaths
English prisoners and detainees
People from Fenton, Staffordshire
1984 in politics